Beirut Phoenicians Rugby Club was the first rugby union club team/club in Lebanon. It was established in 1995 in response to a request from the British embassy for a rugby team to play HMS Cardiff, the first Royal Navy warship to visit Lebanon in 27 years, that was docked in Beirut for a few days in November 1995. With only two hours practice the Beirut Phoenicians came close to beating a team that went on to win the Royal Navy Cup.

External links 
 

Rugby union in Lebanon
Sport in Beirut
Asian rugby union teams
Organisations based in Beirut
1995 establishments in Lebanon